Erik Olof Anders "Olle" Rolén (born 21 October 1944) is a Swedish former alpine skier. He competed at the 1964, 1968 and 1972 Winter Olympics with the best result of 20th place in the giant slalom in 1968.

References

External links
 

1944 births
Swedish male alpine skiers
Alpine skiers at the 1964 Winter Olympics
Alpine skiers at the 1968 Winter Olympics
Alpine skiers at the 1972 Winter Olympics
Olympic alpine skiers of Sweden
People from Åre Municipality
Living people
Sportspeople from Jämtland County
20th-century Swedish people